B. spinosa may refer to:

 Bolama spinosa, a spider in the family Assamiidae
 Bossiaea spinosa, a pea species
 Branchinella spinosa, a species of fairy shrimp
 Bursaria spinosa, a small shrub species

See also
 Spinosa (disambiguation)